There are two Roman Catholic dioceses named San Miguel
Roman Catholic Diocese of San Miguel (El Salvador)
Roman Catholic Diocese of San Miguel (Argentina)